Sergei Vladimirovich Krashchenko (born 8 February 1970) is a Russian football coach and a former player. He works a goalkeepers coach for the Under-19 squad of FC Arsenal Tula.

Honours
 Russian Cup winner: 2003/04.

External links
 

1970 births
Living people
Association football goalkeepers
FC Akhmat Grozny players
Sportspeople from Nalchik
PFC Spartak Nalchik players
Russian footballers
Russian Premier League players